Anita Pipan (born 1970 in Ljubljana) is a Slovenian diplomat who is the Director-General at the Directorate for Multilateral Affairs and Development Cooperation of the Ministry of Foreign Affairs.  She has also served as ambassador to the African Union, Luxembourg, Belgium, and Greece.

References

Living people
Slovenian women ambassadors
Ambassadors of Slovenia to Belgium
Permanent Representatives of Slovenia to the African Union
Ambassadors of Slovenia to Greece
Ambassadors of Slovenia to Luxembourg

University of Ljubljana alumni
1970 births